The AGM-84H/K SLAM-ER (Standoff Land Attack Missile-Expanded Response) is an advanced stand off precision-guided, air-launched cruise missile produced by Boeing Defense, Space & Security for the United States Armed Forces and their allies. Developed from the AGM-84E SLAM (Standoff Land Attack Missile, itself developed by Boeing Integrated Defense Systems from the McDonnell Douglas Harpoon antiship missile), the SLAM-ER is capable of attacking land and sea targets medium to long range (over 155 nautical miles/270 km maximum). The SLAM-ER relies on the Global Positioning System (GPS) and infrared imaging for its navigation and control, and it can strike both moving and stationary targets.

The SLAM-ER can be remotely controlled while in flight, and it can be redirected to another target after launch if the original target has already been destroyed, or is no longer considered to be dangerous (command guidance). The SLAM-ER is a very accurate weapon; as of 2009 it had the best circular error probable (CEP) of any missile used by the U.S. Navy.

History
In 1999, Boeing and the U.S. Navy conducted a live fire of a SLAM-ER from an F/A-18 Hornet on the decommissioned USS Dale (CG-19) off the coast of Puerto Rico.

The SLAM-ER obtained initial operating capability in June 2000. A total of three SLAM-ER missiles were fired by the U.S. Navy during the Iraq War, and the missile was also used during Operation Enduring Freedom in Afghanistan.

The General Electric Company provides an Automatic Target Recognition Unit (ATRU) for the SLAM-ER that processes prelaunch and postlaunch targeting data, allows high speed video comparison (DSMAC), and enables the SLAM-ER to be used in a true "fire and forget" manner. It also includes a "man-in-the-loop" mode, where the pilot or weapons system officer can designate the point of impact precisely, even if the target has no distinguishing infrared signature.

It can be launched and controlled by a variety of aircraft including the F/A-18 Hornet, F/A-18 Super Hornet, F-16 Block 50+ and P-3C Orion, as well as by the U.S. Air Force's F-15E Strike Eagle. Before the retirement of the S-3B Viking, it was also able to launch and control the SLAM-ER. The South Korean air force's version of the F-15E Strike Eagle, the F-15K Slam Eagle, has been capable of launching and controlling the SLAM-ER since 2006 in test exercises.

In 2020, a proposal was put to Congress to allow the sale of the SLAM-ER to Taiwan.

Operators

Current operators

References

External links
 
 Boeing (McDonnell-Douglas) AGM/RGM/UGM-84 Harpoon, Designation Systems
 

Anti-ship missiles of the United States
Air-to-surface missiles of the United States
Cruise missiles of the United States
Military equipment introduced in the 2000s
Fire-and-forget weapons
Boeing